Australia competed at the 1958 British Empire and Commonwealth Games in  Cardiff, Wales, from 18 to 26 July 1958. It was Australia's sixth appearance at the Commonwealth Games, having competed at every Games since their inception in 1930.

Australia won medals in eight of the ten sports that it entered.

Medallists
The following Australian competitors won medals at the games.

|  style="text-align:left; width:78%; vertical-align:top;"|

| width="22%" align="left" valign="top" |

Officials
Chief of Mission / Honorary Treasurer: Jim Eve 
Honorary General Manager: Bill Young 
Attache: Max Phillips 
Section Officials: Athletics Manager - Charles Gardner ; Lawn Bowls Manager - Neil Benjamin ; Boxing Manager - John Castle ; Cycling Manager - Ronald O'Donnell ; Fencing Manager - Vivian Chalwin ; Rowing Manager - Eric Holford, Rowing Coach - Eric Longley ; Swimming Manager - Allan Blue, Swimming Chaperon - Frances May ; Wrestling Manager - Dick Garrard

See also
 Australia at the 1956 Summer Olympics
 Australia at the 1960 Summer Olympics

References

External links 
Commonwealth Games Australia Results Database

1958
Nations at the 1958 British Empire and Commonwealth Games
British Empire and Commonwealth Games